Kegley may refer to:

Places
Kegley, Illinois, unincorporated community in Franklin County, Illinois, United States
Kegley, West Virginia, unincorporated community in Mercer County, West Virginia, United States

People with the surname
Corinne Elaine Kegley, pseudonym briefly used by Corinne Cole (born 1937), American model and actress
Frederick Bittle Kegley (1877–1968), Virginia local historian, agricultural leader and educator
Lindsay Moran Kegley (born 1969), former clandestine officer for the Central Intelligence Agency
R. K. Kegley (1828–1903), American politician in the state of Washington

See also
Marshall and Kegley, United States architectural firm based in Chicago from 1905 to 1926
Keighley
Keightley